Nafsu is a Maldivian suspense thriller web series developed for Medianet Multi-Screen by Ali Shazleem. Produced by Mohamed Fuad under Island Pictures, the series stars Ahmed Saeed, Mariyam Shifa, Mariyam Shakeela, Ali Shazleem and Hamdhan Farooq in pivotal roles. The story follows a wealthy businessman and his young wife who takes a trip to a local island to escape from the hustle and bustle of the Male' city, and how the girl begins to unravel secrets about the guesthouse they stayed in while confronting long buried secrets regarding her past.

Cast

Main
 Ahmed Saeed as Faiz
 Mariyam Shifa as Hudha
 Ali Shazleem as Imran
 Mariyam Shakeela as Afiya
 Nashidha Mohamed as Shamsiyya
 Aminath Shuha as Jaisha
 Suja Abdullah as Hamdhan

Recurring
 Hussain Rasheedh as Iliyas 
 Mohamed Manik as Nimal
 Hamdhan Farooq as Afzal
 Ahmed Alam as Dr. Hussain Shahid
 Mohamed Nubail as Step Dad
 Mariyam Nisha as Hudha's Mother
 Maryam Nawla as Young Hudha      
 Sara Adam as Nadhaa
 Ahmed Solah as Buggy Driver
 Aishath Saajidha as Saaji/Police
 Ibrahim Rasheedh as Police
 Abdulla Saeedh as Police

Episodes

Development
On 21 March 2021, director Ali Shazleem announced the project as the first venture from his production studio, Island Pictures. Filming for the series took place in March 2021 in Th. Kinbidhoo. The indoor scenes of the series were filmed during the mandatory ten-days quarantine period, when travelling to an inhabited island. The outdoor scenes were filmed once the quarantine period was over.

Release and response
In March 2021 it was announced that the series will be made available for streaming during the first week of Ramadan. Later, it was announced that the first episode of the series will be available for streaming from 22 June 2021. Upon release, the series received mainly positive reviews from critics. Ahmed Rasheed from MuniAvas in particular praised director Shazleem's work and wrote: "Shazleem in his debut direction has proved that he can be soon considered as one of the finest local directors".

References

Serial drama television series
Maldivian television shows